Kyle Christie is a Hong Kong cricketer. In 2016, Christie responded to an advert that Cricket Hong Kong posted on Facebook for Hong Kong-born cricketers who are overseas. Later that year, he made his international debut for the Hong Kong national cricket team.

He made his One Day International (ODI) debut against Papua New Guinea on 6 November 2016. He made his first-class debut for Hong Kong in the 2015–17 ICC Intercontinental Cup on 20 October 2017.

In September 2019, he was named in Hong Kong's Twenty20 International (T20I) squad for the 2019–20 Oman Pentangular Series, and the 2019 ICC T20 World Cup Qualifier tournament in the United Arab Emirates. He made his T20I debut for Hong Kong, against Oman, on 5 October 2019.

References

External links
 

Year of birth missing (living people)
Living people
Hong Kong cricketers
Hong Kong One Day International cricketers
Hong Kong Twenty20 International cricketers
Place of birth missing (living people)